Marcello Planca (died 1528) was a Roman Catholic prelate who served as Bishop of Giovinazzo (1517–1528).

Biography
On 21 August 1517, Marcello Planca was appointed by Pope Leo X as Bishop of Giovinazzo. He served as Bishop of Giovinazzo until his death in 1528.

References

External links and additional sources
 (for Chronology of Bishops) 
 (for Chronology of Bishops) 

16th-century Italian Roman Catholic bishops
1528 deaths
Bishops appointed by Pope Leo X